Women Can Do It (WCDI) is a training programme for women originated in the Norwegian Labour Party Women.

The aim of Women Can Do It is to make more women participate in society. The program's ideal is that because women make up half the world's population, they should have half the power and as many formal positions and authority as men. This is not the fact at present. Women are systematically under-represented in decision-making positions around the world, less visible in the media, hold fewer parliamentary seats and occupy fewer leading posts in political parties than men.

The training
Women Can Do It is a training course for women; it aims at building confidence, learning the rules of political and organisational work and giving courage to the participants to speak out and taking part in decision-making processes.
"The quality of the seminars: In the seminars gender equality issues are presented in a simple
way, and the skills taught are down-to-earth and practical. An overwhelming percentage of
respondents in the survey as well as among the interviewees are very satisfied with the
seminars. They report that the knowledge and skills gained in the seminars are useful in
everyday life."

Arranging WCDI is one way of increasing women's participation. Encouraging women to participate in society, in NGOs, in political parties, speaking up at work or in the family, is important. Women's opinions are important and should be heard. Women often hold back from speaking their mind, worried that they will not be as eloquent as the men, will not be listened to, or they are afraid to be ridiculed or neglected at meetings."Every fourth Russian woman suffers from some kind of domestic violence and doesn’t get proper respect and confession in our society."

Women Can Do It is both training for specific organisational skills, but it is also an opportunity for women to meet and form networks. WCDI can be arranged independently of an organization for the general purpose of increasing women's participation in society, or it can be held within a party or organization for increasing the number of women within.

The programme has been conducted in more than 25 countries worldwide, and The Norwegian Labour Party arranges the training with the partnership of Norwegian People's Aid.

Topics 
The Training contents the following topics: Democracy and women's participation, Communication, Argumentation, speeches, debates, 
Working with the media, Negotiations – resolution of conflicts, Networking, Advocacy and campaigning, Violence against women 
How to arrange WCDI – Trainer skills

See also 
:Category:Women's rights by region
Violence against women

References

External links 
WCDI Homepage
NORAD Women Can Do It – an evaluation of the WCDI programme in the Western Balkans
European Forum Gender Network - Women can do it project
“Women in the Land of Conflict”

Gender equality
Women's rights in Norway